The 1979 Cal Poly Mustangs football team represented California Polytechnic State University, San Luis Obispo as a member of the California Collegiate Athletic Association (CCAA) during the 1979 NCAA Division II football season. Led by 12th-year head coach Joe Harper, Cal Poly compiled an overall record of 7–3 with a mark of 2–0 in conference play, winning the CCAA title for the fourth consecutive season. The Mustangs  played home games at Mustang Stadium in San Luis Obispo, California.

Schedule

References

Cal Poly
Cal Poly Mustangs football seasons
California Collegiate Athletic Association football champion seasons
Cal Poly Mustangs football